The 1948–49 season was the inaugural season of A group under the name Republican Football Division. Cherno More started the season as TVP but was renamed after the first round to Botev pri DNV, a common practice in the years after the establishment of the People's Republic of Bulgaria. Botev is 19th-century Bulgarian revolutionary and poet Hristo Botev and pri DNV stands for Home of the People's Army.

Republican Football Division

Matches

League standings

Results summary

Goalscorers

Bulgarian Cup

Torpedo Pernik is a former name of Minyor Pernik

References 

PFC Cherno More Varna seasons
Cherno More Varna